Roberto Villanueva Puno (born March 27, 1962) is a Filipino politician. A member of the National Unity Party party, he was elected a Member of the House of Representatives of the Philippines, representing the 1st District of Antipolo from 2007 to 2016, and again in 2019. He is an alumnus of the Ateneo de Manila University and a staunch supporter of Philippine basketball.

References

Kapampangan people
People from Antipolo
1962 births
Living people
Kabalikat ng Malayang Pilipino politicians
Lakas–CMD politicians
Members of the House of Representatives of the Philippines from Antipolo
National Unity Party (Philippines) politicians
Deputy Speakers of the House of Representatives of the Philippines